Season 2001-02 saw Livingston compete in the Scottish Premier League. They also competed in the League Cup and the Scottish Cup.

Summary
In their first season in the Scottish Premier League having won promotion the previous season Livingston finished third. They reached the Quarter final of the Co-operative Insurance Cup and the fourth round of the Scottish Cup being knocked out by Aberdeen.

Results & fixtures

SPL

League Cup

Scottish Cup

Squad

Statistics

League table

References

Livingston
Livingston F.C. seasons